Golos Prikazchika ('Shop-Assistant's Voice') was a weekly newspaper published in St. Petersburg, Russia, from April to October 1906.

References

Defunct weekly newspapers
Defunct newspapers published in Russia
Mass media in Saint Petersburg
Newspapers published in the Russian Empire
Publications established in 1906
Publications disestablished in 1906
1906 establishments in the Russian Empire